Nkechi Caroline Ikpeazu (née Nwakanma) is the First Lady of Abia State as wife of the current Governor of Abia State located in the southeast of Nigeria.

Early life and education
Nkechi Ikpeazu was born in Ile-Ife. She hails from Ohanze Isiaha in Obingwa LGA of Abia State. She attended Community Primary School Ohanze; Girls High School, Aba; Teacher Training College Ihie; Alvan Ikoku College of Education Owerri; Enugu State University of Science and Technology Enugu; University of Nigeria Nsukka; the National Open University of Nigeria; and the Abia State University, Uturu. She possess an NCE in Business Studies, a bachelor's degree in Cooperatives and Rural Development, a post graduate Diploma in Management and a master's degree in management. She has completed a doctorate at the Abia State University, Uturu.

Career
Nkechi has worked as a teacher, an accounts executive with Camway Ventures Lagos, a banker with Lobi Bank from 1986 to 1996, and as Registrar of Cooperatives with Abia State Government.

Nkechi is a sports promoter and the major backer of the women football premier league club side, Abia Angels FC.

Charitable work
Through her NGO, the Vicar Hope Foundation, VHF, she has built several homes for indigent persons. The Vicar Hope Foundation VHF is also involved in providing better healthcare for mother and child, and in battling cancer, diabetes, and sickle cell diseases. VHF has completed two sickle cell hospital/cancer diagnosis and treatment centres in Umuahia and Aba and offers subsidized treatment to patients. The Foundation also runs a GBV Response Desk that offers interventions and referral for prevention and protection.

Personal life 
Nkechi is married to the current Governor of Abia State, Dr. Okezie Ikpeazu, who hails from Umuobiakwa, Obingwa LGA. Together they have two boys and two girls. Ikpeazu is a Deaconess of the Seventh Day Adventist Church and professes a close relationship with God.

See also 

 List of first ladies of Nigerian states

References

Year of birth missing (living people)
Living people
Nigerian women in politics
Nigerian politicians
University of Nigeria alumni
Nigerian Seventh-day Adventists
People from Ife